Richard Heywood (by 1520 – 1570), of London, was a Member of Parliament for Helston in 1545.

References

Year of birth uncertain
1570 deaths
English MPs 1545–1547
Members of the Parliament of England for Helston